North Island is a small island in Whitewater Bay, near southwestern Admiralty Island, Alaska.

See also
 List of islands of Alaska

Islands of Alaska
Islands of Hoonah–Angoon Census Area, Alaska
Islands of the Alexander Archipelago